California High School may refer to:
 California High School (San Ramon, California)
 California High School (Whittier, California)

See also
 California School (disambiguation) 
 California (disambiguation)